Gölsdorf may refer to:

 Louis Adolf Gölsdorf (1837–1911), Austrian engineer and locomotive designer, father of Karl
 Karl Gölsdorf (1861–1916), Austrian engineer and locomotive designer, son of Louis Adolf
 Gölsdorf axle, system used on railway locomotives invented by Karl Gölsdorf